Prachinburi Provincial Administrative Organization Stadium is a multi-purpose stadium in Prachinburi province, Thailand. It is used mostly for football matches and is the home stadium of Prachinburi United F.C. The stadium holds 3,000 people.

Football venues in Thailand
Multi-purpose stadiums in Thailand
Buildings and structures in Prachinburi province
Sport in Prachinburi Province